Jeremy Russell (August 31, 1944 – March 8, 2005), also known as "Jerry Russell", was a co-founder, with Eric Albronda, of US rock band Blue Cheer.  Russell and Albronda were music aficionados who organized the band and provided initial financing.

After Blue Cheer, Jeremy worked for several music studios in London during the 1970s.  Upon returning to the United States, he worked at the Double H ranch, which had been built by Mr. Russell's grandfather, and various jobs in Arizona.

He died after a long battle with Myelodysplasia, MDS (a bone disease) in Tucson, Arizona.

1944 births
2005 deaths
20th-century American musicians